Claudia Maria Franco Solana (born 21 July 1975), also known as Claudia Franco Walsh, is a former competition swimmer who represented Spain at two consecutive Summer Olympics.

Early years 

Franco was born in Madrid, Spain.  She is the younger sister of Olympic swimmer Barbara Franco.  Both sisters attended Mission Viejo High School in Mission Viejo, California, where they swam for the Mission Viejo high school swim team.

College career 

Franco attended  the University of Florida in Gainesville, Florida, where she swam for the Florida Gators swimming and diving team in National Collegiate Athletic Association (NCAA) competition in 1993 and 1994.  During her two years as a Gator, she won four Southeastern Conference (SEC) championships as a member of the Gators winning relay teams, and received six All-American honors.  She subsequently transferred to Stanford University in Palo Alto, California, where she won five NCAA championships as a member of Stanford's national championship team in 1996.

International career 

At the 1992 Summer Olympics in Barcelona, Spain, Franco competed in the 50-meter freestyle, the 100-meter freestyle, and the 4x100-meter freestyle relay.  She finished twenty-first in the world in both individual events, and the Spanish women's team finished thirteenth in the relay.  At the 1996 Summer Olympics in Atlanta, Georgia, she was again a member of the Spanish Olympic team, and finished eleventh in the 50-meter freestyle, and twenty-first in the 100-meter freestyle, and was a member of the Spanish relay teams that finished fourteenth in the 4x100-meter freestyle and 4x100-meter medley relay events.

See also 

 List of Stanford University people
 List of University of Florida Olympians

References 

1975 births
Living people
European Aquatics Championships medalists in swimming
Spanish female freestyle swimmers
Florida Gators women's swimmers
Olympic swimmers of Spain
Swimmers from Madrid
Stanford Cardinal women's swimmers
Swimmers at the 1992 Summer Olympics
Swimmers at the 1996 Summer Olympics
Mediterranean Games gold medalists for Spain
Mediterranean Games medalists in swimming
Swimmers at the 1997 Mediterranean Games
20th-century Spanish women